Sant Andreu (also known as Barcelona-Sant Andreu; previously Sant Andreu Comtal) is a Rodalies de Catalunya station in the Sant Andreu district of Barcelona. Passengers can also commute here to Barcelona Metro line 1 station Sant Andreu. It is located completely over ground.

Sant Andreu Comtal railway station used to have up to 10 rail tracks, which were decreased to 2 in 2010 due to the construction works for building the new Sagrera railway station. Local and regional services which previously terminated here were diverted to Estació de França in 2009 in preparation for these changes.

As per December 3, 2022, Sant Andreu Comtal will no longer provide commuter rail services and is replaced by the neighbouring Sant Andreu railway station.

See also
Sant Andreu Arenal railway station

References

External links
 Barcelona Sant Andreu Comtal listing at Rodalies de Catalunya website
 Information and photos of the station at trenscat.cat 

Defunct railway stations in Barcelona